Veckatimest Island is one of the Elizabeth Islands, part of the town of Gosnold in Dukes County, Massachusetts, United States.

The island received further recognition after Brooklyn band Grizzly Bear named their third studio album after it. The band's founding member, Ed Droste, is connected to the Forbes family, who own Naushon Island, through his mother Diana Forbes.

References

Elizabeth Islands
Uninhabited islands of Massachusetts
Coastal islands of Massachusetts